The 1955 Arizona Wildcats football team represented the University of Arizona in the Border Conference during the 1955 college football season.  In their fourth season under head coach Warren B. Woodson, the Wildcats compiled a 5–4–1 record (1–2–1 against Border opponents) and were outscored by their opponents, 184 to 169. The team captains were Paul Hatcher and Bill Codd.  The team played its home games in Arizona Stadium in Tucson, Arizona.

Tailback Art Luppino rushed for 1,313 yards during the 1955 season and was the NCAA rushing leader for the second consecutive season.

Schedule

References

Arizona
Arizona Wildcats football seasons
Arizona Wildcats football